October 22 is a 1998 American drama film directed by Richard Schenkman and written by Fred Golan.  It premiered at the Ft. Lauderdale Film Festival.

Plot

A group of disparate patrons in a Los Angeles diner are having breakfast when a psychopath enters with a gun, holds them hostage and has a standoff with the SWAT Team.

The film then cuts to earlier that same day, showing how each character came to be in the diner. The narrative progresses non-sequentially, but working towards the moment when the gunman opens fire. Each character is shown going about their daily lives, individually revealing themes of romance, obsession and desperation.

The film climaxes back in the diner, and features a surprise twist ending.

Cast
 Amanda Plummer as Denise
 Colm Meaney as Steve
 Paul Perri as Police Captain
 Michael Paré as Gary
 Ivana Miličević as Debra
 Mark Boone Junior as Bob
 Donna Murphy as Carole
 Ernie Hudson as Arthur
 Tate Donovan as Peter

Reception 
VideoHound's DVD Guide compared it to Pulp Fiction and The Life Before This.

References

External links 
 
 

1998 films
1998 drama films
American independent films
American drama films
Films directed by Richard Schenkman
1990s English-language films
1990s American films